Edward Lipiński may refer to:
 Edward Lipiński (economist)
 Edward Lipiński (orientalist)